Joseph Émilienne Essombe Tiako (born 22 March 1988) is a Cameroonian wrestler. She competed in the women's freestyle 53 kg event at the 2016 Summer Olympics, in which she was eliminated in the round of 16 by Betzabeth Argüello.

In March 2019, she won the silver medal in the women's freestyle 57 kg event at the 2019 African Wrestling Championships. In 2019, she also represented Cameroon at the 2019 African Games and she won the gold medal in the women's freestyle 53 kg event.

In 2020, she won the gold medal in the women's freestyle 53 kg event at the 2020 African Wrestling Championships. She qualified at the 2021 African & Oceania Wrestling Olympic Qualification Tournament to represent Cameroon at the 2020 Summer Olympics in Tokyo, Japan. She lost her bronze medal match in the women's 53 kg event.

She won the gold medal in her event at the 2022 African Wrestling Championships held in El Jadida, Morocco.

References

External links
 
 
 
 
 

1988 births
Living people
Cameroonian female sport wrestlers
Olympic wrestlers of Cameroon
Wrestlers at the 2016 Summer Olympics
Wrestlers at the 2020 Summer Olympics
African Games medalists in wrestling
African Games gold medalists for Cameroon
African Wrestling Championships medalists
Competitors at the 2019 African Games
20th-century Cameroonian women
21st-century Cameroonian women